This is a list of Chinese football transfers for the 2015 season summer transfer window. The transfer window opened on 22 June 2015 and closed on 16 July 2015.

Super League

Beijing Guoan

In:

 

Out:

Changchun Yatai

In:

Out:

Chongqing Lifan

In:

 
 
 

Out:

Guangzhou Evergrande Taobao

In:

 
 
 
 

 

Out:

Guangzhou R&F

In:
 
 
 
 
 

Out:

Guizhou Renhe

In:

 
 
 
 

Out:

Hangzhou Greentown

In:

 
 
 
 
 
 
 
 

Out:

Henan Jianye

In:

 
 

Out:

Jiangsu Guoxin Sainty

In:

 
 

Out:

Liaoning Whowin

In:

 
 
  

Out:

Shandong Luneng Taishan

In:

 
 

Out:

Shanghai Greenland Shenhua

In:

 
 
 
 
 
 
 
 
 
 
 
 
 
 
 
 
 
 
 
 
 
 

Out:

Shanghai Shenxin

In:

 

Out:

Shanghai SIPG

In:

 
 
 
 

Out:

Shijiazhuang Ever Bright

In:

 
 

Out:

Tianjin TEDA

In:

 
 
 
 

Out:

League One

Beijing BG

In:

 
 
 

Out:

Beijing BIT

In:

Out:

Dalian Aerbin

In:

Out:

Guizhou Zhicheng

In:

 

Out:

Harbin Yiteng

In:

 
 

Out:

Hebei Zhongji

In:

  
 

Out:

Hunan Billows

In:

 

Out:

Jiangxi Liansheng

In:

 
 

Out:

Nei Mongol Zhongyou

In:

 
 

Out:

Qingdao Hainiu

In:

 

Out:

Qingdao Jonoon

In:

 

Out:

Shenzhen F.C.

In:

 
 
 

Out:

Tianjin Songjiang

In:

 
 
 
 

Out:

Wuhan Zall

In:

 
 
 

Out:

Xinjiang Tianshan Leopard

In:

 

Out:

Yanbian Changbaishan

In:

 

Out:

League Two

North League

Baoding Yingli ETS

In:

 

 
 

 

Out:

Baotou Nanjiao

In:

 
 
 
 
 
 
 

Out:

Dalian Transcendence

In:

Out:

Hebei Elite

In:

Out:

Tianjin Huochetou

In:

Out:

Nanjing Qianbao

In:

 

Out:

Shenyang Dongjin

In:

Out:

Yinchuan Helanshan

In:

Out:

South League

Anhui Litian

In:

 
 

 
 
 
 

Out:

Fujian Broncos

In:

 

Out:

Guangxi Longguida

In:

 

Out:

Lijiang Jiayunhao

In:

Out:

Meixian Hakka

In:

 
 

Out:

Meizhou Kejia

In:

 

 

Out:

Sichuan Longfor

In:

Out:

Yunnan Wanhao

In:

Out:

References

2015
2015 in Chinese football
Chinese